Raas is a surname. Notable people with the surname include:

Jan Raas (born 1952), Dutch cyclist
Naser al-Raas ( 1983–2016), Canadian political activist

See also
Raa (surname)
Raes, surname